Amir Kabir Publishers (also romanized as Amir-Kabir) is a publishing house based in Tehran, Iran and founded on November 19, 1949, by Abdorrahim "Taghi" Jafari. It is named after Mirza Taghi Khan Amirkabir, the Iranian consul in Qajar era.

Company history 
Following the Islamic Revolution in 1979, the Iranian government seized Amir Kabir Publishers's assets. Subsequently, the organization's new owners imposed a new management structure. The publishing house is still active, but only publishes previously published material, classics, and conservative new books.

Amir Kabir Publishers is the publisher of The Persian Encyclopedia.

The Amir Kabir Publishers edition of Sadegh Hedayat's novel بوف کور (The Blind Owl) was one of the titles selected for the Library of Congress 2014 "A Thousand Years of the Persian Book" exhibition.

The firm regularly attends the Tehran International Book Fair and overseas book fairs, including at Frankfurt and Bologna.

The company's current address is 6th Floor, I&M Organization, BONYAD Building, Africa Square, Tehran.

Book series 
 Etudes iraniennes (Centre iranien pour le dialogue des civilisations)  
 Golden Books
 Shāhkārʹhā-yi adabiyāt-i Fārsī (شاهكار هاي ادبيات فارسى ؛) (English, "Masterpieces of Persian Literature")  (1954- )

References

External links
 Amir Kabir Publishers at Encyclopædia Iranica
 Jafari's autobiography at BBC Persian

Book publishing companies of Iran